Frederick William Brook Thellusson, 5th Baron Rendlesham (9 February 1840 – 9 November 1911), was a British Conservative politician.

He was born in Florence, Italy, to Frederick Thellusson, 4th Baron Rendlesham, and his wife Elizabeth Charlotte, daughter of Sir George Prescott, 2nd Baronet, and former wife of General Sir James Duff. His mother died when he was less than one year old. In 1852, aged twelve, he succeeded in the barony on the death of his father. However, as this was an Irish peerage it did not entitle him to a seat in the House of Lords.

 Lord Rendlesham was appointed Sheriff of Suffolk in 1870 and elected to the House of Commons as member of parliament (MP) for Suffolk East at a by-election in March 1874, a seat he held until the constituency was abolished at the 1885 general election.

Educated in England at Eton and Oxford, he was reportedly a fine footballer at Eton and maintained a keen interest in other sports in later life, being on the National Hunt Committee as well as a member of the Jockey Club and the Royal Yacht Squadron.

Failing eyesight in 1911 caused him to resign from long-held positions as chairman of the East Suffolk County Council and the Suffolk Quarter Sessions. He subsequently contracted blood-poisoning, leading to the amputation of his left hand in July 1911.

Lord Rendlesham married Lady Egidia, daughter of Archibald Montgomerie, 13th Earl of Eglinton, in 1861. They had three sons and five daughters. Lady Rendlesham died in January 1880. Lord Rendlesham remained a widower until his death in November 1911, aged 71. He was succeeded in the barony by his eldest son Frederick.

Notes

References 
Kidd, Charles, Williamson, David (editors). Debrett's Peerage and Baronetage (1990 edition). New York: St Martin's Press, 1990,

External links 
 

1840 births
1911 deaths
Barons in the Peerage of Ireland
Members of East Suffolk County Council
Thellusson, Frederick
Thellusson, Frederick
Thellusson, Frederick
Thellusson, Frederick
High Sheriffs of Suffolk
People educated at Eton College
Alumni of the University of Oxford